The Maritime is a SOHO complex at the Jelutong suburb near the city of George Town in Penang, Malaysia. Located at Karpal Singh Drive, it consists of two residential skyscrapers, collectively named The Maritime Suites, and The Maritime Piazza, which serves as the retail component of the mixed development. It is the 32nd tallest building in Malaysia outside of Kuala Lumpur.

The Maritime Suites consist of Suites A and B, which contains 36 and 40 floors of duplex SOHO suites respectively. Meanwhile, The Maritime Piazza now houses The Maritime Automall, which also includes several al fresco eateries and other retail outlets.

History 

Built by IJM Corporation, a Malaysian property conglomerate, The Maritime formed part of the development of the IJM Promenade, which was subsequently renamed after Karpal Singh, a prominent local DAP politician who was killed in a road accident in 2014. The completion of The Maritime, also in 2014, has also helped to elevate Karpal Singh Drive into a vibrant waterfront destination on Penang Island.

See also 
List of tallest buildings in George Town
 Karpal Singh Drive

References

External links 
 The Maritime Waterfront Hotel

Residential skyscrapers in Malaysia
2014 establishments in Malaysia
Buildings and structures in George Town, Penang
Buildings and structures completed in 2014